Nassarius semiplicatoides is a species of sea snail, a marine gastropod mollusk in the family Nassariidae, the nassa mud snails or dog whelks.

Description

Distribution

References

External links
 Zhang, Ai-Ju, You, Zhong-Jie (2007). A new species of Nassariidae from Zhejiang Province, China (Gastropoda, Prosobranchia, Neogastropoda). Acta Zootaxonomica Sinica 32(4): 900-902
 Reeve, L. A. (1853-1854). Monograph of the genus Nassa. In: Conchologia Iconica, or, illustrations of the shells of molluscous animals, vol. 9, pls 1-29 and unpaginated text. L. Reeve & Co., London.
 Cernohorsky W.O. (1984). Systematics of the family Nassariidae (Mollusca: Gastropoda). Bulletin of the Auckland Institute and Museum. 14: 1-356

Nassariidae
Gastropods described in 1847